Hitcham War Memorial is located outside St Mary's Church, Hitcham Lane, Hitcham, Buckinghamshire, England. It is a grade II listed building with Historic England and commemorates men who died in the First and Second World Wars.

References

Grade II listed monuments and memorials
Grade II listed buildings in Buckinghamshire
British military memorials and cemeteries